Alonso López may refer to:

 Alonso López (boxer) (born 1986), Mexican flyweight boxer
 Alonso López (footballer) (born 1957), Colombian footballer
 Alonso López (motorcyclist) (born 2001), Spanish motorcycle racer